Aliyah Abrams (born 3 April 1997) is a Guyanese sprinter specialising in the 400 metres. She placed fifth in the women's 400m at the 2022 World Indoor Championships in Belgrade.

Abrams represented Guyana at the 2016 Rio Olympics in the women's 400 metres race; her time of 52.79 seconds in the heats did not qualify her for the semifinals.

She qualified in her specialist event for the 2020 Tokyo Olympics, where she was eliminated in the semi-finals.

Her sister is fellow athlete Jasmine Abrams.

Personal bests
 100 metres – 11.52 (+1.6 m/s Columbia, SC 2019)
 200 metres – 23.33 (+0.3 m/s Charleston, SC 2019)
 300 metres indoor – 37.09 (Louisville, KY 2022) South American best
 400 metres – 51.13 (Austin, TX 2019)
 400 metres indoor – 51.57 (Belgrade 2022) South American record

References

External links

1997 births
Living people
Guyanese female sprinters
Olympic athletes of Guyana
Athletes (track and field) at the 2016 Summer Olympics
Athletes (track and field) at the 2020 Summer Olympics
South Carolina Gamecocks women's track and field athletes
Athletes (track and field) at the 2019 Pan American Games
Pan American Games competitors for Guyana
Olympic female sprinters
21st-century American women